"Always the Sun" is a song by English rock band the Stranglers, first released as a single on 6 October 1986, the second single from the band's ninth studio album Dreamtime (1986). A remixed version was released as a single on 24 December 1990. Both versions were Top 30 hits in the United Kingdom. "Always the Sun" was released in October 1986 in four different formats: a seven-inch single, shaped seven-inch picture disc, twelve-inch single, and as a double seven-inch single pack.

Reception
Despite radio play and much hype, it only reached no. 30 in the UK Singles Chart. However, it was a hit throughout Europe (no. 15 in France, 16 in Ireland) and nearly broke the Stranglers in the United States through radio play. The song also reached no. 21 in Australia.

Lead vocalist, and lead guitarist Hugh Cornwell mentioned in his book The Stranglers Song by Song that he thought it could have been as big as "Golden Brown". He recalls going to CBS for a midweek prediction on how the song would chart and was amazed at the bad news. He also wrote "We'd given CBS something great to work with and I could see in this guy's face that he knew he hadn't delivered", giving the impression that Cornwell felt that CBS was to blame for this poor position.

Video
The video for "Always the Sun" showed the Stranglers performing in a dark room, all on separate small stages with Hugh Cornwell on the ground. During the song, after Cornwell sings "Who has the fun? Is it always a man with a gun?" he takes out a gun and shoots the Aztec Sun Calendar Wheel, which then shatters.

The cover artwork of the single shows the Stranglers' band logo and the Aztec Sun Calendar Wheel glyph on a black background.

Track listings

7": Epic / SOLAR 1 (UK) 
Side one
 "Always the Sun" – 4:04
Side two
 "Norman Normal" – 4:30

7": Epic / 34-06990 (US) 
Side one
 "Always the Sun" – 3:55
Side two
 "Mayan Skies" – 3:52

12": Epic / SOLAR T1 (UK) 
Side one
 "Always the Sun (Hot Mix)" – 5:58
Side two
 "Norman Normal" – 4:30
 "Souls (Live) – 3:18

12" Promo: Epic / EAS 02573 (US) 
Side one
 "Always the Sun (Hot Mix)" – 5:58
Side two
 "Always the Sun (LP Version)" – 4:48
 "Always the Sun (Single Edit)" – 4:00

Limited Edition Double 7": Epic / SOLAR D1 (UK) 
Disc one Side one
 "Always the Sun" – 4:04
Side two
 "Norman Normal" – 4:30
Disc two Side one
 "Nice in Nice" – 3:44
Side two
 "Since You Went Away" – 2:52

Charts

Issue with "Big in America"
The two tracks from the seven-inch single were reissued in December 1986, as half of a double seven-inch release of the band's next single, "Big in America".

Sunny Side Up Mix

Following Hugh Cornwell's departure from the band in August 1990, Epic Records decided to release a greatest hits compilation album. To promote this compilation, a remix of "Always the Sun" was released as a single on 24 December 1990, Christmas Eve. The remix consisted of extra guitar work from new guitarist John Ellis and a slight variation in the music, although Cornwell's original vocals were still used. Like the original, the single got good airplay, but peaked at no. 29, one place higher than the original. Cornwell stated in his book Song by Song that he was not angered by the remix, asserting that he was privileged that Epic Records thought "Always the Sun" was good enough to be re-released, and feeling that the band changed little of the original recordings.

Track listings
7" Single/cassette single

  "Always the Sun (Sunny Side Up Mix)" – 3:56
  "Burnham Beeches" – 3:40

12" Single

 "Always the Sun (Long Hot Sunny Side Up Mix)"
 "Burnham Beeches"
 "Straighten Out" (live)

CD Single

 "Always the Sun (Sunny Side Up Mix)"
 "Nuclear Device" (live)
 "All Day and All of the Night" (live)
 "Punch and Judy" (live)

Charts

Other versions
A live version of the song was included on the album All Live and All of the Night in February 1988.

References

External links
 

1986 singles
1990 singles
The Stranglers songs
1986 songs
Epic Records singles
Songs written by Dave Greenfield
Songs written by Hugh Cornwell
Songs written by Jean-Jacques Burnel
Songs written by Jet Black